Kevin Todd (born May 4, 1968) is a Canadian former ice hockey forward who played in the National Hockey League (NHL).

Todd started his NHL career with the New Jersey Devils in 1988–89.  He also played for the Edmonton Oilers, Chicago Blackhawks, Los Angeles Kings, and Mighty Ducks of Anaheim.  He left the NHL after the 1997–98 season and spent one season in Switzerland for EV Zug before retiring after a career ending neck injury.

Todd won the AHL's Les Cunningham Award and John B. Sollenberger Trophy 1990-91 season. He broke the New Jersey Devils rookie scoring record previously held by Kirk Muller, but since broken by Scott Gomez.

Career statistics

External links

1968 births
Living people
Canadian ice hockey centres
Chicago Blackhawks players
Edmonton Oilers players
EV Zug players
Long Beach Ice Dogs (IHL) players
Los Angeles Kings players
Mighty Ducks of Anaheim players
New Jersey Devils draft picks
New Jersey Devils players
Prince Albert Raiders players
Ice hockey people from Winnipeg
Utica Blizzard players
Utica Devils players